Sid Thompson (17 July 1905 – 24 June 1975) was  a former Australian rules footballer who played with Footscray in the Victorian Football League (VFL).

Notes

External links 
		

1905 births
1975 deaths
Australian rules footballers from Victoria (Australia)
Western Bulldogs players